The Rundle family name is a prominent one in many parts of southwest England, particularly Cornwall.

Notable people with the surname include:

Adam Rundle, English football player
David Rundle, South African cricketer
David Allen Rundle, American serial killer
John Rundle, British politician
Katherine Fernandez Rundle, State Attorney in Florida, United States
 Sir Leslie Rundle (1856-1934), British Army General
Mary Rundle, British naval officer
Robert E. Rundle, American chemist and crystallographer
Robert Terrill Rundle, missionary in Western Canada in the mid-1800s
Sophie Rundle, English actress
Peter Rundle, English actor
Tony Rundle, former premier of Tasmania, Australia

Originating from the manor at Cobham in Kent which at the time of the Norman invasion was called Roundale or Rundale (the site which is now named Randall Wood). The surname of Rundale, Rundell, Rundle, etc. was originally of 'middling' noble blood, owning a baronage in Cobham, Kent in the twelfth century that lasted for just two generations.

Earliest records indicate that in 1203 the manor was granted to Henry de Cobham. In the 13th century we then find that his son, Henry de Cobham de Rundale inherits Rundale. The line then passes to his son, Stephen de Cobham de Rundele, who becomes first Baron Rundell.

The elder or Kentish line of the Cobhams terminated in an heiress, and she married Sir John Oldcastle, who was summoned to Parliament in right of his wife, as Baron Cobham, in 1409, and who afterwards became famous as the leader of the Lollards.

The Rundle family was then centered in the southwest, where amongst other things - and like many in the area - the family was a prominent member of the seafaring community and owned a large number of taverns until the mid seventeenth century.

The Rundle family today is still largely based in the southeast of England, but also has strong centers in and around the south of London, to where many moved from the southwest and from Wales in the first half of the twentieth century.

Some authorities have tried to link the surname 'Rundell' to the Arundells another noble family of the West country, but this link remains unproven.

See also
Baron Cobham
Rundell (disambiguation)

References

External links
Rootsweb
 The Rundell-Biddick Association of America

English-language surnames